Pearlie Posey (1894-1984) was an American quilt artist and mother of Sarah Mary Taylor. She is known for her appliquéd quilts.

Biography
Posey was born in 1894. She taught her quilting technique to her daughter Sarah Mary Taylor and eventually created templates for Taylor's quilts.

Her work is in the collection of the Philadelphia Museum of Art and the American Folk Art Museum. Her work was included in the 2008-2009 traveling exhibition entitled Ancestry & Innovation: African American Art from the American Folk Art Museum presented by the Smithsonian Institution Traveling Exhibition Service. She was included in the 2009 exhibition Quilt Stories: The Ella King Torrey Collection of African American Quilts and Other Recent Quilt Acquisitions at the Philadelphia Museum of Art.

Posey died in 1984.

References

1894 births
1984 deaths
20th-century African-American women
20th-century African-American artists
Quilters